Suspicious Minds: The Memphis 1969 Anthology is a two-disc compilation of Elvis Presley's studio recordings at American Sound Studio during the winter of 1969, released in 1999, RCA 67677-2. This set features all of the master recordings made by Presley that would eventually feature on multiple singles as well as the albums From Elvis in Memphis and the studio disk of From Memphis to Vegas/From Vegas to Memphis. Original recordings produced by Chips Moman and Felton Jarvis.

Contents 
For the bulk of the 1960s, Elvis had been trapped in a cycle of making three movies a year, and recording their attendant soundtracks in either Nashville or Hollywood. After the success of his Christmas special on NBC in December 1968, Presley made a decision not to continue with business as usual, but instead to return to recording in his hometown of Memphis, Tennessee, to take advantage of the thriving soul music scene active at the city's studios such as Stax and Hi Records. Presley chose American Studios, run by songwriter Chips Moman, for several reasons. First, their music staff was populated by session musicians steeped in Elvis' upbringing in blues, country, gospel, and rock and roll; second, they knew how to give the music a "commercial" gloss, Moman having already produced or written hits for Aretha Franklin and The Box Tops; third, after hitting the top ten on the singles chart only once since 1963 with a song that had been recorded in 1960, Presley needed hits.

The choice would prove fortuitous, as singles gleaned from these sessions would yield three top ten hits, including the last chart-topper of Presley's career, his latter-day signature song "Suspicious Minds." The album work would be equally respected, From Elvis in Memphis being considered by myriad sources as one of Presley's greatest. In 2003, the album was ranked number 190 on Rolling Stone magazine's list of the 500 greatest albums of all time.

The first twelve tracks of disc one present From Elvis in Memphis in order, including the lead single of "In the Ghetto" backed with "Any Day Now," released two months before the album hit the stores. It continues with the hit singles and "Stranger in My Own Hometown," a song Presley would return to in the future, a Rehearsal version issued on disc five of the 1970s box set. The second disc compiles the balance of From Memphis to Vegas, along with the remaining masters that ended up buttressing various albums in the 1970s. Ten alternate takes are included, along with a previously unissued snippet of a song attempted at the sessions but never completed. The success of this material would infuse Presley's career with a new vigor, which would fuel re-acquaintance with his talents both in the studio and in live performance during the early years of the new decade.

Track listing 
Chart positions for LPs Billboard 200 chart; positions for singles from Billboard Hot 100 chart.

Disc one

Disc two

Personnel 

 Elvis Presley – vocals, guitar, piano
 Reggie Young – guitar, electric sitar
 Bobby Wood – piano
 Bobby Emmons – organ
 Tommy Cogbill – bass
 Mike Leech – bass
 Gene Chrisman – drums
 Ed Kollis – harmonica
 R.F. Taylor – trumpet
 Wayne Jackson – trumpet
 Dick Steff – trumpet
 Ed Logan – trombone
 Jack Hale – trombone
 Gerald Richardson – trombone
 Jackie Thomas – saxophone, trombone
 Andrew Love – saxophone
 Glen Spreen – saxophone, string and horn arrangements
 J.P. Luper – saxophone
 Tony Cason – french horn
 Joe D'Gerolamo – French horn
 Joe Babcock – backing vocals
 Dolores Edgin – backing vocals
 Mary Greene – backing vocals
 Charlie Hodge – backing vocals
 Ginger Holladay – backing vocals
 Mary Holladay – backing vocals
 Millie Kirkham – backing vocals
 June Page – backing vocals
 Susan Pilkington – backing vocals
 Sandy Posey – backing vocals
 Donna Thatcher – backing vocals
 Hurschel Wiginton – backing vocals

References 

Compilation albums published posthumously
1999 compilation albums
Elvis Presley compilation albums
RCA Records compilation albums